Ion Suru (20 October 1927 – 1979) was a Romanian footballer. He competed in the men's tournament at the 1952 Summer Olympics.

Honours
Dinamo București
Liga I: 1955
Cupa României: 1958–59

References

External links

1927 births
1979 deaths
Romanian footballers
Romania international footballers
Olympic footballers of Romania
Footballers at the 1952 Summer Olympics
Liga I players
Liga II players
CFR Cluj players
FC Rapid București players
FC Dinamo București players
CSM Câmpia Turzii players
People from Turda
Association football wingers